The Rural Municipality of Tullymet No. 216 is a rural municipality (RM) in the Canadian province of Saskatchewan within Census Division No. 6 and  Division No. 1.

History 
The RM of Tullymet No. 216 incorporated as a rural municipality on January 1, 1913.

Heritage properties
There are three historical sites located within the RM.
File Hills Post Office\Thompson Farm - Constructed in 1900, the site is located five kilometres south of the Town of Ituna.
Jewish Cemetery  (also called the Lipton Jewish Cemetery) - Established in 1902, the cemetery is the resting place for early Jewish Romania immigrants.
Tullymet Yard (also called the Robertson Homestead; Tullymet Post Office; RM of Tullymet No. 216 Office) - Now used as a maintenance yard by the municipality, the yard was originally the Robertson Homestead when it was constructed from 1907 to 1937.

Demographics 

Government 
The RM of Tullymet No. 216 is governed by an elected municipal council and an appointed administrator that meets on the first Tuesday of every month. The reeve of the RM is Aaron Keisig while its administrator is Sheila Keisig. The RM's office is located in Balcarres.

References 

Tullymet
Division No. 6, Saskatchewan